"Awa Whigs Awa" is a Scottish song whose theme is the aftermath of the Jacobite Rising of 1745. Written well after the events it commemorates, it is not a genuine Jacobite song, as is the case with many others now considered in the "classic canon of Jacobite songs," most of which were songs "composed in the late eighteenth and nineteenth centuries, but were passed off as contemporary products of the Jacobite risings." A version was published in 1789 by Robert Burns.

References

Jacobite songs
Political songs
1789 songs
Jacobite rising of 1745